Radovanye is a rural locality (a selo) in Simskoye Rural Settlement, Yuryev-Polsky District, Vladimir Oblast, Russia. The population was 5 as of 2010.

Geography 
Radovanye is located 38 km north of Yuryev-Polsky (the district's administrative centre) by road. Poluyevo is the nearest rural locality.

References 

Rural localities in Yuryev-Polsky District